Joseph Henderson  (1832–1908) was a Scottish landscape painter, genre painter, portrait painter and marine painter.
His genre was particularly painting working men such as shepherds, crofters, pedlars, cobblers, fishermen and farm labourers. However he also painted Scottish country and coastal scenery.

Biography 

Henderson studied at the Trustees Academy in Edinburgh and  started to work as a portrait painter but having done so for about twenty years he discovered his true vocation which was marine painting. He marveled the painting of the sea in all its different conditions and light. He exhibited his work  at the Royal Scottish Academy and at the Royal Glasgow Institute of the Fine Arts.  
He also exhibited at the Royal Academy in London from 1871 to 1886 and in Suffolk Street Galleries from 1882 to 1884. 
He was the President of the Glasgow Art Club, in which city he settled in 1852. He is buried at Sighthill Cemetery.

Family
Henderson married three times: in 1855, Helen Cosh; in 1869, Helen Young of Strathaven (died 1871); and in 1872, Eliza Thomson.

Two of his sons John Henderson (1860–1924) and J. Morris Henderson also known as Joseph Morris Henderson RSA (1863–1936) also became painters in their own right.

His daughter Marjory Henderson (1856–1936) married the well known Scottish painter William McTaggart, who painted in 1894 a wonderful portrait of Joseph Henderson which was presented by the family of Joseph Henderson in 1925 to the Glasgow Museums.

See also
List of Scots

Notes

Further reading 
 J. Craig Annan (1908). The Art of Joseph Henderson
 Hilary Christie-Johnson, 2013. " Joseph Henderson : Doyen of Glasgow Artists 1832-1908"

References

The Dictionary of British Artists 1880-1940 compiled by J.Johnson and A. Greutzner, Antique Collectors Club, 1976, Baron Publishing, Woodbridge, Suffolk

External links
  http://sutcliffegalleries.com/joseph-henderson/
  https://web.archive.org/web/20110912102739/http://www.anthonywoodd.com/artist/joseph-morris-henderson
  
  http://www.markmitchellpaintings.com/joseph-henderson-1832-1908-afternoon-light-sold/

19th-century Scottish painters
Scottish male painters
20th-century Scottish painters
People from Perth and Kinross
1832 births
1908 deaths
British Impressionist painters
Scottish landscape painters
Artists from Edinburgh
British marine artists
Scottish portrait painters
Alumni of the Edinburgh College of Art
19th-century Scottish male artists
20th-century Scottish male artists